Bartaz is a town in the Zangilan District of Azerbaijan.

References 

Populated places in Zangilan District